Trapeziidae is a family of crabs, commonly known as coral crabs. All the species in the family are found in a close symbiosis with cnidarians. They are found across the Indo-Pacific, and can best be identified to the species level by the colour patterns they display. Members of the family Tetraliidae were previously included in the Trapeziidae, but the similarities between the taxa is the result of convergent evolution.

Subfamilies and genera
The World Register of Marine Species lists the following subfamilies and genera:

Calocarcininae Stevcic, 2005 
Calocarcinus Calman, 1909
Philippicarcinus Garth & Kim, 1983
Sphenomerides Rathbun, 1897
Quadrellinae Stevcic, 2005 
Hexagonalia Galil, 1986
Hexagonaloides Komai, Higashiji & Castro, 2010
Quadrella Dana, 1851
Trapeziinae Miers, 1886
Trapezia Latreille, 1828

References

External links

Crabs
Taxa named by Edward J. Miers
Decapod families